Rickard Koch (born 24 February 1976) is a Swedish bandy player who currently plays for Hammarby IF Bandy as a midfielder.  Koch represented the Swedish national bandy team in the 2004/05 season. In April 2008 he signed a new two-year contract with "Bajen". 

Koch has played for:
 Selånger SK (1993–1996)
 IFK Kungälv (1996–1998)
 Sandvikens AIK (1998–2001)
 Hammarby IF Bandy (from 2001)

External links
  Rickard Koch at Bandysidan.nu
  Rickard Koch profile at Hammarby IF

1976 births
Swedish bandy players
Living people
Selånger SK Bandy players
IFK Kungälv players
Sandvikens AIK players
Hammarby IF Bandy players
Gustavsbergs IF players